Rune Glifberg (born 7 October 1974), nicknamed "The Danish Destroyer", is a Danish professional skateboarder. He is one of three skaters to have competed at every X Games. He has a total of 12 X Games medals. At 46, he became the oldest skateboarder to ever compete in the Olympic Games and the first male skateboarder to ever compete in a park event in the Olympic Games when he represented Denmark in the men's park event at the 2020 Summer Olympics in Tokyo.

Early life
Rune Glifberg was born in Copenhagen and began skating at the age of 11 years after a friend brought a skateboard as a gift, which he had bought in the US. He entered his first pro contest in France in 1990 and turned pro in 1992. Glifberg moved from Denmark to Costa Mesa, California, after he finished secondary school in 1995.

Professional skateboarding
In the early 1990s, Glifberg turned professional as a vert skater and relocated to the United States. Glifberg signed a contract with Flip Skateboards and, as of July 2021, he remains a member of the company's professional team.

As of September 2012, Glifberg has released a line of signature shoes with Converse that consists of "The Allston" and the "Rune Pro Mid" models.

Glifberg is a playable character in the first five games of the Tony Hawk series of video games that consists of the four Pro Skater games and Tony Hawk's Underground.

Company owner
Glifberg is a part-owner of Pipeline Distribution and runs a Copenhagen-based event company "RunEvent". RunEvent was the organizer of 2010's "Burning of the Witch" skateboard contest at Amager Strandpark in Copenhagen. Burning of the Witch was jointly sponsored by Volcom, one of Glifberg's sponsors, and Thrasher Magazine. RunEvent organized Glifberg's 25th skateboarding anniversary that was held at Fælledparken in Copenhagen during the summer of 2011.

In 2009, Glifberg and architect Ebbe Lykke founded the skatepark design firm Glifberg+Lykke in Copenhagen. The duo have since taken the lead on a number of projects in Europe, including the Streetdome in Haderslev, Denmark; Oslo Skatehalll in Oslo, Norway; Skatepark Eller in Düsseldorf, Germany; and the Urban Sport Zone in Amsterdam, Netherlands.

Personal life
Glifberg resided in the United States for seventeen years, living for a period in the Leucadia district of Encinitas, California. He moved back to Denmark in the early 2010s and, as of 2021, is based in Copenhagen.

Contest history

X-Games history:
 Summer 2013 Skateboard Park: 4
 Summer 2013 Skateboard Park: 2
 Summer 2012 Skateboard Park: 3
 Summer 2011 Skateboard Vert: 17
 Summer 2011 Skateboard Park: 7
 Summer 2010 Skateboard Park: 7
 Summer 2009 Skateboard Vert: 7
 Summer 2009 Skateboard Park: 1
 Summer 2008 Skateboard Vert: 10
 Summer 2008 Skateboard Park: 1
 Summer 2007 Skateboard Vert: 7
 Summer 2006 Skateboard Vert: 5
 Summer 2005 Skateboard Vert Best Trick: 5
 Summer 2005 Skateboard Vert: 9 
 Summer 2004 Skateboard Vert: 3
 Summer 2003 Skateboard Vert Doubles (Mike Crum): 2
 Summer 2003 Skateboard Vert Best Trick: 6 
 Summer 2003 Skateboard Vert: 3
 Summer 2002 Skateboard Vert Doubles (Mike Crum): 3 
 Summer 2002 Skateboard Vert: 3 
 Summer 2001 Skateboard Vert: 6
 Summer 2000 Skateboard Vert Doubles (Mike Crum): 6
 Summer 2000 Skateboard Vert 5
 Summer 1999 Skateboard Vert Doubles (Mike Crum): 3
 Summer 1999 Skateboard Vert: 12 
 Summer 1998 Skateboard Vert: 12
 Summer 1997 Skateboard Vert Doubles (Mike Crum): 5
 Summer 1997 Skateboard Vert: 2 
 Summer 1996 Skateboard Vert: 17 
 Summer 1995 Skateboard Vert: 3

Competitive History
 2nd. Place - 2010 Vans Protec Pool Party
 2nd. Place - 2009 Converse Fix To Ride 
 1st. Place - 2009 X GAMES 15 Skateboard Park
 1st. Place - 2009 Copenhagen Pro vert
 3rd. Place - 2009 Vans Protec Pool Party
 1st. Place - 2008 X GAMES 14 SUPERPARK
 1st Place. WCSK8 - World Champion Skateboarding World Bowl Rankings 
 2nd. Place - 2008 Copenhagen Pro vert
 1st. Place - 2008 Quiksilver Bowlriders Malmo
 1st. Place - 2008 Vans Protec Pool Party
 2nd. Place - 2008 Bondi Bowl-A-Rama Australia
 1st. Place - 2008 Okaley Bowl-A-Rama Wellington, New Zealand 
 1st. Place - 2007 Copenhagen Pro vert 
 2nd in 2007 WCSK8 World Bowl Rankings 
 1st. Place - 2007 Protec Pool Party
 1st. Place - 2007 Bowl-A-Rama Australia
 1st. Place - 2007 Quiksilver Bowlriders (Sweden) 
 1st. Place - 2006 Northshore Bowl Jam
 3rd. Place - 2006 Desert Dog Park Slalom
 1st. Place - 2006 Desert Dog Bowl Bash
 2nd. Place - 2006 GVR Etnies Bowl
 1st. Place - 2006 Mystic Sk8 Cup: Vert 
 2nd. place - 2006 Oregon Trifecta West Linn, Oregon Bowl
 1st. Place - 2006 Oregon Trifecta Lincoln City, Oregon Bowl
 2nd. Place - 2006 WCSK8 World Bowl Rankings
 2nd. Place - 2006 Vans Pro-Tec Pool Party
 1st. Place - 2005 Vans Pro-Tec Pool Party 
 1st. Place - 2004 Mystic Sk8 Cup: Vert
 3rd. Place - 2004 Toronto West 49 Open Vert Best Trick
 3rd. Place - 2004 Toronto West 49 Open Vert 
 1st. Place - 2004 Gravity Games: Vert
 1st. Place - 2004 Snickers Bowl Games
 2nd in 2003 WCSK8 Pro Vert European Rankings
 2nd. Place - 2003 Globe World Championships Vert
 1st. Place - 2003 Scandinavian Open: Vert
 1st. Place - 2003 Tampa Pro: Vert
 2nd in 2002 Pro Vert European Rankings 
 1st. place - 2002 Scandinavian Open: Vert
 Ranked 1st; World Champion Skateboarding Vert 2001
 1st Place  -  2001 Scandinavian Open: Vert
 1st. Place -  2001 Gravity Games: Vert
 1st. Place -  1998 Slam City Jam: Vert
 1st. Place - 1996 Slam City Jam: Vert

Sponsors
Active sponsors as of July 2021:
 Flip Skateboards
Hazard Wheels
Indy
 Monster Energy
Nike SB
Pro-Tec
 Volcom

Former sponsors 
 Converse
 MOB Griptape
Oakley
 Ricta

References

External links

 Rune Glifberg at The Boardr

1974 births
Living people
Danish skateboarders
X Games athletes
Skateboarders at the 2020 Summer Olympics
Olympic skateboarders of Denmark
Danish expatriate sportspeople in the United States
Sportspeople from Copenhagen